The Best of Bobby Vinton is a 12-track collection of previously recorded songs by Bobby Vinton; it was released in 1985. This collection contains two songs that Vinton recorded for ABC Records ("Killing Me Softly With Her Song",and "My Melody of Love", and six for Epic Records ("Roses Are Red (My Love)", "Mr. Lonely", "Blue Velvet", "There! I've Said It Again", "Blue on Blue", and "I Love How You Love Me"), and one for the Canadian label of Ahed Records ("Medley"). The last two songs, "Will You Still Love Me Tomorrow" and "Don't You Know", make their first album appearances on this collection.
"My Special Angel"is re-recording and first appearance on this LP.

Track listing

Album credits
Selections of "Roses Are Red," "Mr. Lonely," "Blue Velvet," "There! I've Said It Again," "Blue on Blue," and "I Love How You Love Me" courtesy of CBS Special Products.
All other selections courtesy of Rex Ford Productions, Inc.
Special thanks to Bobby Vinton, Joseph G. Zynczak, and Alan Bernhard

1985 greatest hits albums
Bobby Vinton compilation albums